Abraham Jones (1725–1792) was a member of the 1st New York State Legislature 1777 to 1778 from Richmond County, New York. Jones was expelled from the New York Assembly on June 8, 1778, for being with the enemy.

Jones was born to a Welsh family which bought their original land in what is now the New Springville section on Staten Island from Governor Dongan. He commanded a company in Billopp's Battalion of Staten Island, a Loyalist militia group. During the course of the American Revolutionary War he was captured by American rebels, who brought him to Trenton, New Jersey where he was imprisoned.

Upon the war's conclusion he moved to Nova Scotia for a brief period, but upon returning to the States in 1792 he died at sea, where he was buried.

Family
Jones was married to Jannetje Personet (1731-1808), daughter of George Personet and Jenneke Mangels. They had two sons and one daughter.

References

1725 births
1792 deaths
American people of Welsh descent
People from Staten Island
Loyalists in the American Revolution from New York (state)
Members of the New York State Assembly
Expelled members of the New York State Assembly
18th-century American people
18th-century American politicians
Loyalist military personnel of the American Revolutionary War